Rebii Barış Güney (born December 3, 1983) is a Turkish professional basketball player who plays as a point guard for Tofaş of the Turkish Basketball League.

External links
Barış Güney FIBA Profile
Barış Güney TBLStat.net Profile
Barış Güney Eurobasket Profile
Barış Güney TBL Profile

1983 births
Living people
Aliağa Petkim basketball players
Antalya Büyükşehir Belediyesi players
Beşiktaş men's basketball players
Darüşşafaka Basketbol players
Fenerbahçe men's basketball players
Kepez Belediyesi S.K. players
Mersin Büyükşehir Belediyesi S.K. players
Point guards
Shooting guards
Basketball players from Istanbul
Tofaş S.K. players
Turkish men's basketball players
Türk Telekom B.K. players
Yeşilgiresun Belediye players